Yantar-4K2M ( meaning amber), also known as Kobalt-M, is a type of Russian reconnaissance satellite and is the current operational member of the Yantar series of satellites. In common with most Yantar satellites the Kobalt-M uses film rather than digital cameras. This film cannot be sent to Earth as easily as digital data.

The Kobalt-M is an improved version of the Kobalt satellite and the first one was launched as Kosmos 2410 in 2004. It returns three sets of film during its mission. The first two land in film return canisters (called SpK - Spuskayemaya Kapsula) and a final set of film returns in the satellite's special equipment module. Image resolution is reportedly 30 cm.

Ten satellites of this series were launched, the last one in 2015; no further orders are planned. Further reconnaissance missions are carried out by the Persona-class satellites.

Launches

References

Yantar (satellite)
Reconnaissance satellites of Russia
Spacecraft launched by Soyuz-2 rockets
Spacecraft launched by Soyuz-U rockets